Alan Melville (9 April 1910 – 24 December 1983) was an English broadcaster, writer, actor, raconteur, producer, playwright and wit.

Biography
Born William Melville Caverhill in Berwick-upon-Tweed, Northumberland, England, he was educated in his home town and then a boarder at the Edinburgh Academy. Leaving school at 17, he started work in the family timber merchants as an apprentice joiner. At the age of 22, he entered an essay competition in John O'Leary's Weekly with an essay entitled My Perfect Holiday and won the first prize; a return trip to Canada (1934). Soon afterwards he sent the BBC North Region six short stories called The Adventures of the Pink Knight (1934), which were accepted and used on Children's Hour. He was required to read the stories himself, his first professional engagement. He continued to write from the timber yard, his short stories, poems, manuscripts sometimes being accepted by various publishers. He wrote his first novel, a whodunit called Weekend at Thrackley, which was accepted and published and later made into a film called Hot Ice.

Melville left the timber yard and struggled on his own for a while until he met a composer called George McNeill. Together they turned out number after number, Melville writing the lyrics. In 1936 the BBC offered him a job as a scriptwriter in the variety department in London under Eric Maschwitz at £250 per year. After a three-month training course, he was sent to the Aberdeen radio station as features and drama producer.

In the early part of World War II, he compiled daily instalments of the Robinson Family serial about an ordinary family in London on the BBC's North American Service. In 1941 he enlisted in the RAF where he reached the rank of Wing Commander. He worked as a war correspondent sending regular dispatches to the BBC. His experience enabled him to write First Tide. 
He was with the Allied Invasion force of 1944 and took part in the Normandy landings,  sending back reports to the BBC; then onto Brussels and in Germany for the surrender. He was sent back to London on embarkation leave, after which he should have gone to the Far East but was kept for an RAF pageant in the Royal Albert Hall, which he scripted and Ralph Reader  directed with 1,500 RAF personnel.

During the war years he wrote revues, Sweet and Low, Sweeter and Lower and Sweetest and Lowest, which ran in all for five years at the Ambassadors Theatre. After its success, he was signed up on a five-year contract for London Films by Alexander Korda.  Melville's collaboration with composer Charles Zwar began in 1942 when they wrote Which Witch? for Sky High; they continued to work together for some of the numbers in Sweeter and Lower and for all of Sweetest and Lowest.

After the war he wrote plays including Castle in the Air (1949; filmed in 1952), Full Circle (1952, previously Dear Charles and adapted from Les Enfants d'Edouard by Marc-Gilbert Sauvajon and Frederick J. Jackson), Simon and Laura 1954, which was later made into a film in 1955, and the book and lyrics for the musical Gay's the Word (1950, music by Ivor Novello). The musical premiered at the Palace Theatre, Manchester in 1950 and transferred to the Saville Theatre in London in 1951, where it ran for 504 performances and starred Cicely Courtneidge, Lizbeth Webb and Thorley Walters.

In 1951, Melville wrote the musical Bet Your Life, with music by Kenneth Leslie Smith and Charles Zwar and starring Arthur Askey and Julie Wilson.  A few years later he wrote the musical Marigold based on the play by Francis R. Pryor and L Allen Harker; the score  was composed by Charles Zwar and it starred Jean Kent, Sally Smith, Sophie Stewart and Jeremy Brett.
 
Alan Melville became one of Britain's first television stars. He became chairman of The Brains Trust and a panelist in What's My Line? He wrote and appeared in many television programmes, among them A to Z, which ran for two years (1957–58) and played host to more than 400 guests including Bob Hope, Phil Silvers, John Dankworth and Dame Edith Evans.
 
Merely Melville, one of his television programmes, he used as a title for his autobiography.
He took the leading role from Ian Carmichael in the play Gazebo at the Savoy Theatre. Moira Lister was his co-star.

He moved to Brighton in 1951 and died at the age of 73 in December 1983 at the Royal Sussex County Hospital, Brighton, where he had been a patient since November. He was cremated in the Downs Crematorium, Brighton, on 12 January 1984.

Works

Plays 
Castle in the Air
Dear Charles
Simon and Laura
Jonathan
Devil May Care
Mrs. Willie
Top Secret
Change of Tune
The Bargain (in America)
Everything Happens on a Friday
Top Priority
Grande Dame
Demandez Vicky (European production)
Finder Bitte Melden (European production)
Content to Whisper
Here is the News (Paradise Island)

Fiction 
Weekend at Thrackley (London, Skeffington & Son, 1934, Re-published British Library Publishing Division, 2018)
Quick Curtain (London, Skeffington & Son, 1934. Re-published British Library Publishing Division, 2015)
The Vicar in Hell (London, Skeffington & Son, 1935)
Eleven Twenty-Seven [as Neil Carruthers] (London, Rich & Cowan, 1935)
Death of Anton (London, Skeffington & Son, 1936. Re-published British Library Crime Series, 2015)
Warning to Critics: A Murder aka The Critic on the Hearth (London, Skeffington & Son, 1936)

Non-fiction 
Myself When Young (London, Max Parish, 1955, ASIN:B0000CJALP)
First Tide (London, Skeffington & Son, 1944, ASIN:B00MJ94BJQ)
Gnomes & Gardens (London, Heinemann/Quixote Press, 1983,)

Revues and musicals 
Sky High, 1942
Sweet and Low, 1943
Sweeter and Lower, 1944
Sweetest and Lowest, 1946
Between Ourselves, 1946
A la Carte, 1948
Bet Your Life, 1952
At the Lyric, 1953
Going to Town, 1956
All Square, 1963
Gay's the Word (with Ivor Novello), 1950
Marigold, 1959

TV series 
Melville Mixture, 1953
The Brains Trust, 1955–57
What's My Line? 1956-61
A to Z, 1957–58
Merely Melville, 1958
Points of View, 1962
Call My Bluff 1966
Melvillainy, 1962
Raise your Glasses, 1962
The Whitehall Worrier, 1967
The Very Merry Widow, 1967–69
Misleading Cases, 1967–68
Before the Fringe, 1967–68
Brighton Belle, 1972

Bibliography 
Merely Melville, an autobiography (London, Hodder & Stoughton 1970)

References

External links
 Selected plays by Alan Melville in University of Bristol Theatre Archive
 Desert Island Discs  
 Internet Movie Database
 Internet Broadway Database 

1910 births
1983 deaths
English broadcasters
English male television actors
English television personalities
People educated at Edinburgh Academy
People from Berwick-upon-Tweed
20th-century English dramatists and playwrights
20th-century English male actors
English male dramatists and playwrights
20th-century English male writers
Royal Air Force personnel of World War II
Royal Air Force wing commanders